Adrian E. Raftery (born 1955 in Dublin, Ireland) is an Irish and American statistician and sociologist. He is the Boeing International Professor of Statistics and Sociology, and founding Director of the Center for Statistics and Social Sciences at the University of Washington in Seattle, Washington, United States.

Raftery studied mathematics and statistics at Trinity College Dublin, Ireland, and obtained his doctorate in mathematical statistics in 1980 from the Université Pierre et Marie Curie in Paris, France, advised by Paul Deheuvels.  From 1980 to 1986 he was a lecturer in statistics at Trinity College Dublin, and since then he has been on the faculty of the University of Washington. He was elected a Fellow of the American Academy of Arts and Sciences in 2003 and a member of the United States National Academy of Sciences in 2009. He was identified as the world's most cited researcher in mathematics for the decade 1995-2005 by Thomson-ISI.

, Raftery has written or coauthored over 150 articles in scholarly journals. His research has focused on the development of new statistical methods, particularly for the social, environmental and health sciences. He has been a leader in developing methods for  Bayesian model selection and Bayesian model averaging, and model-based clustering, as well as inference from computer simulation models. He has recently developed new methods for probabilistic weather forecasting and probabilistic population projections.

Selected publications
Raftery, A. E. (2001). Statistics in Sociology, 1950—2000: A Selective Review. Sociological Methodology, 31, 1-45.

References

External links
 Adrian Raftery's home page
 

1955 births
Irish statisticians
American statisticians
Living people
Alumni of Trinity College Dublin
Scientists from Dublin (city)
Members of the United States National Academy of Sciences
Fellows of the American Statistical Association
Fellows of the American Academy of Arts and Sciences
Bayesian statisticians